Lord Wandsworth College (LWC) is a co-educational private school in Long Sutton, Hampshire, England, for day and boarding pupils between the ages of 11–18, which occupies a 1,200 acre campus and is known for its charitable foundation. It is a member of the Headmasters' and Headmistresses' Conference.

Since 2015, the headmaster has been Adam Williams.

In 2020, the College was named Independent School of the Year for Student Wellbeing, and was awarded the Schools of Character Kitemark by the Association of Character Education.

Notable former pupils

Notable former pupils include:
 Charlie Amesbury, rugby union player
 Grace Blakeley, political commentator, journalist and author
 Will Buxton, journalist and broadcaster
 Sir Peter Coulson, High Court judge
 Scott S. Hall, Professor, Stanford University School of Medicine
 George 'Johnny' Johnson, RAF officer with the “Dambusters”
 Ugo Monye, rugby union international and broadcaster
 Peter Richards, rugby union international
 Julian Sands, actor 
 Rupert Whitaker, co-founder of the Terrence Higgins Trust
 Jonny Wilkinson, rugby union international
 Ryan Wilson, rugby union international

St Neot's Partnership

In April 2021 the College entered into a formal collaboration with St Neot's Preparatory School, Hampshire.

St Neot’s is a leading independent, co-educational nursery, pre-prep and prep school which welcomes pupils from 2 to 13 years. It is set in a 70-acre woodland site in Eversley. There has been a strong relationship between the two schools over many years, with a significant proportion of St Neot’s families choosing LWC for their children’s secondary education.

See also
Sydney Stern, 1st Baron Wandsworth

References

External links
Lord Wandsworth College - official web site
Sternians Association - the Old Boys Association of Lord Wandsworth College

Member schools of the Headmasters' and Headmistresses' Conference
Private schools in Hampshire
Educational institutions established in 1928

1928 establishments in England